Guillermo Eugenio Mario Snopek (born 11 January 1975) is an Argentine politician of the Justicialist Party. He has served as a National Senator for Jujuy Province since 2017, having previously served in the lower chamber of Congress from 2015 to 2017 and in the Legislature of Jujuy from 2009 to 2015.

Early life
Snopek was born on 11 January 1975 in San Salvador de Jujuy into a prominent political family. His father, Guillermo Eugenio Snopek (1947–1996), served as governor of Jujuy, while his grandfather, Guillermo Snopek (1916–2007) served as vice governor of the province and as a national senator during the 1960s.

Snopek studied law at the National University of Tucumán, graduating in 2001.

Political career
A member of the Justicialist Party, Snopek was first elected to the Legislature of Jujuy in 2009. He was re-elected in 2013. In 2015, Snopek ran for a seat in the National Chamber of Deputies as the first candidate in the Front for Victory list, followed by Carolina Moisés. The list received 37.75% of the vote, enough only for Snopek to be elected.

Two years later, in the 2017 legislative election, Snopek ran for National Senator for Jujuy, as the first candidate in the Justicialist Front list. With 20.79% of the vote, Snopek's list came second in the general election, and he was elected as the minority seat. His vacancy in the Chamber of Deputies was filled by Moisés.

During his term as senator, Snopek presided the parliamentary commission on constitutional affairs, and formed part of the commissions on justice and criminal affairs, general legislation, rights and guarantees, mining and energy, infrastructure and housing, systems and mass media, environment and sustainable development, magistrate trials, and the permanent bicameral commission on legislative procedure. In 2018 and later in 2020, he voted against the Voluntary Interruption of Pregnancy Bill, which legalised abortion in Argentina.

References

External links

1975 births
Living people
People from Jujuy Province
Members of the Argentine Senate for Jujuy
Members of the Argentine Chamber of Deputies elected in Jujuy
Justicialist Party politicians
21st-century Argentine politicians